Marshall Frank Moore was an American Civil War veteran, attorney, and the seventh Governor of Washington Territory.

Biography
He attended Yale University. The couple had three children; Mary Louise, Frances, and Thomas.

Career
Moore served as a state judge in the Common Pleas Court and as a prosecuting attorney in Sioux City, Iowa.

Moore joined the Union Army during the civil war and served under George McClellan in Virginia and under Sherman. The colonel commanded the 69th Ohio Infantry Regiment and led various brigades for much of the war. He was at Rich Mountain, Shiloh, Chickamauga, Jonesboro and Missionary Ridge.

Moore was Governor of Washington Territory from 1867 to 1869. He was accompanied to Olympia, Washington, by his brother-in-law, Philemon Beecher Van Trump, who served as Moore's private secretary. Moore was a delegate to the United States Congress from Washington Territory in 1868.  He also was an attorney in New Orleans.

Death
He is interred at Masonic Memorial Park, Tumwater, Thurston County, Washington.

References

External link

1829 births
1870 deaths
19th-century American judges
19th-century American lawyers
Governors of Washington Territory
Iowa state court judges
Lawyers from Binghamton, New York
People of New York (state) in the American Civil War
Politicians from Binghamton, New York
Union Army colonels